Robert Joseph "Bob" Beemer (born February 8, 1955) is an American sound mixer who has won four Oscars.

Biography
Bob Beemer was born on February 8, 1955, at Hollywood Presbyterian Medical Center in Hollywood, California. Graduating from Loyola High School, Los Angeles in 1973, he studied Communication Arts and English at Loyola Marymount University in Los Angeles, California, earning a bachelor's degree in 1977 with a double major in those two fields. Always fascinated by sound, he became an expert in remixing for movies.  His first professionally recorded sound was on Roots (1977).

Academy Awards
Beemer has won four Academy Awards for Best Sound and has been nominated for another three:

Won
 Speed (1994)
 Gladiator (2000)
 Ray (2004)
 Dreamgirls (2006)

Nominated
 Cliffhanger (1993)
 Independence Day (1996)
 Road to Perdition (2002)

References

External links
 
 Bob Beemer's profile at LMU website

1955 births
Living people
American audio engineers
Best Sound Mixing Academy Award winners
Best Sound BAFTA Award winners
People from Los Angeles
Production sound mixers
Loyola Marymount University alumni
Engineers from California